Väisälä may refer to:

 Vaisala, Samoa, a village in the island of Savai'i
 Vilho Väisälä (1889–1969), Finnish meteorologist and physicist
 Vaisala, a company founded by Vilho Väisälä
 Yrjö Väisälä (1891–1971), Finnish astronomer and physicist
 1573 Väisälä, a main belt asteroid
 Väisälä (crater), a lunar impact crater

See also
 Brunt–Väisälä frequency
 Schmidt-Väisälä camera, an astronomical telescope
 139P/Väisälä–Oterma, a periodic comet in the solar system